The Battle of Annan Moor was a battle of the Scottish civil war, part of the intertwined Wars of the Three Kingdoms that took place in England, Ireland, and Scotland between 1639 and 1651.

The Royalist army led by Lord Digby and Marmaduke Langdale had been trying to force a passage north to link up with the Marquis of Montrose. The battle took place on 20 and 21 October 1645 when the experienced cavalry commander Sir John Brown of Fordell and his newly raised Scots cavalry regiment defeated the Royalists army. The Royalists lost more than half of their 600 men as casualties or prisoners. The remainder of the Royalist were driven back into England.

References
 Brown, C, Scottish Battlefields, Gloucestershire, 2008.

Sources
 Furgol, E., A Regimental History of the Covenanting armies (John Donald, 1990).

1645 in Scotland
Battles of the Scottish Civil War
Conflicts in 1645
Battles involving Scotland
Battle